William Pulsford (1772–1833), the elder, was a London merchant and a plantation owner in Jamaica. He became a landowner in several English counties.

Career
He was in business with his father, Robert Pulsford the elder (died 1835). In the 1790s they became partners with Thomas Latham (1744–1818). The Pulsford family firm, trading as R. & W. Pulsford, were wine merchants, of Great St Helens, London. As Latham & Pulsford, they became slave-owning West India merchants. They connected to American dealings with Caribbean plantations through David Lenox (1753–1828) of Philadelphia.

Later life
In 1821, Pulsford bought the manor of Linslade in Buckinghamshire. He died 17 December 1833, leaving £250,000.

Family
Pulsford married in 1805 Martha Hobson, daughter of William Hobson of Tottenham. Their children included:

Anne (1807–1889), married in 1832 Sir William Hayter, 1st Baronet, and was mother of Arthur Hayter, 1st Baron Haversham.
Frances, married Alfred Latham
Elizabeth
William (1813–1879), joint owner of the Aleppo estate in Jamaica. He bought the manor of Greatworth, Northamptonshire, from William Montague Higginson, holding also Linslade.
Robert (1814–1888), Member of Parliament for

Notes

1772 births
1833 deaths
English merchants
Sugar plantation owners